Phase modulation (PM) is a modulation pattern for conditioning communication signals for transmission. It encodes a message signal as variations in the instantaneous phase of a carrier wave. Phase modulation is one of the two principal forms of angle modulation, together with frequency modulation.

In phase modulation, the instantaneous amplitude of the baseband signal modifies the phase of the carrier signal keeping its amplitude and frequency constant. The phase of a carrier signal is modulated to follow the changing signal level (amplitude) of the message signal. The peak amplitude and the frequency of the carrier signal are maintained constant, but as the amplitude of the message signal changes, the phase of the carrier changes correspondingly.

Phase modulation is widely used for transmitting radio waves and is an integral part of many digital transmission coding schemes that underlie a wide range of technologies like Wi-Fi, GSM and satellite television. It is also used for signal and waveform generation in digital synthesizers, such as the Yamaha DX7, to implement FM synthesis. A related type of sound synthesis called phase distortion is used in the Casio CZ synthesizers.

Theory

Phase modulation changes the phase angle of the complex envelope in proportion to the message signal.

If m(t) is the message signal to be transmitted and the carrier onto which the signal is modulated is
,

then the modulated signal is

This shows how  modulates the phase - the greater m(t) is at a point in time, the greater the phase shift of the modulated signal at that point. It can also be viewed as a change of the frequency of the carrier signal, and phase modulation can thus be considered a special case of FM in which the carrier frequency modulation is given by the time derivative of the phase modulation.

The modulation signal could here be

The mathematics of the spectral behavior reveals that there are two regions of particular interest:

Modulation index
As with other modulation indices, this quantity indicates by how much the modulated variable varies around its unmodulated level. It relates to the variations in the phase of the carrier signal:
 ,

where  is the peak phase deviation. Compare to the modulation index for frequency modulation.

See also
 Angle modulation
 Automatic frequency control 
 Modulation for a list of other modulation techniques
 Modulation sphere
 Polar modulation
 Electro-optic modulator for Pockel's Effect phase modulation for applying sidebands to a monochromatic wave

Radio modulation modes